The Surrender Tree: Poems of Cuba's Struggle for Freedom is a verse novel set in Cuba, written by Margarita Engle and published in 2008. It received the award of a John Newbery Honor in 2009.

Plot
The novel opens in Cuba in 1886, at a time when it was still ruled by the Spanish Empire and Cubans have fought for years for their independence. Rosa, considered by some to be a witch, is a nurse that has the gift of healing. As a child she learns a holistic way of healing with flowers and herbs. Ten years later she uses these skills to aid the suffering, as many people starve and grow sick in Weyler's concentration camps. Rosa does not discriminate against anyone needing help, and turns caves into hospitals that are hidden and known only to a few. The slave hunter, Lieutenant Death, has become obsessed with finding Rosa, and destroying the hospitals that she has created.

Characters
Rosa: once a slave and then turned into a nurse healer
Lieutenant Death: Slave hunter
Valeriano Weyler, 1st Duke of Rubí: A ruthless army officer
Silvia: orphan child

Historical basis
The character of Rosa is based on a historical Cuban heroine, Rosa Castellanos, known as “La bayamesa”. However, the real Rosa was born in 1834 and would have been in her fifties and sixties in the period covered by the novel.

Critical reception

The Surrender Tree has been viewed by many and seen as a powerful book of poems.  The Horn Book Magazine writes “A powerful narrative in free verse...haunting.” “Hauntingly beautiful, revealing pieces of Cuba’s troubled past through the poetry of hidden moments” said School Library Journal.  Others may agree with Kirkus Reviews saying that “Young readers will come away inspired by these portraits of courageous ordinary people.” The author “Engle writes her new book in clear, short lines of stirring free verse caught by the compelling narrative voices, many readers will want to find out more.” Finally, “The Poems are short but incredibly evocative” according to Voice of Youth Advocates.

Awards
2009 Newbery Honor 
2009 Pura Belpre Medal
2009 Claudia Lewis Award
2009 Jane Adams Children's Book
Michigan Great Lakes Great Books Award Master List
Lee Bennett Hopkins Honor
ALA Best Books for Young Adults
Americas Award
Booklist Editor's Choice
Junior Library Guild Selection
ALA Notable Book
NCSS-CBC Notable Social Studies Book
Amelia Bloomer Book
Kansas State Reading Circle

See also
Santiago Surrender Tree
Rosa Castellanos article at Spanish Wikipedia

References

External links
Review at About.com

2008 American novels
2008 children's books
Newbery Honor-winning works
American young adult novels
American historical novels
Children's historical novels
Novels set in Cuba
Verse novels
War poetry
Cuban poetry collections
American poetry collections
Square Fish books